Sunken Gardens may refer to:

Gardens

United States 
 Ball Nurses' Sunken Garden and Convalescent Park, in Indianapolis, Indiana
 McCasland Sunken Garden, in the Dallas Arboretum and Botanical Garden
 San Antonio Japanese Tea Garden also called Sunken Gardens, in San Antonio, Texas
 Scott Sunken Garden, a historical landmark in Lansing, Michigan
 Sunken Gardens (Denver, Colorado), listed on the National Register of Historic Places in northeast Denver
 Sunken Gardens (Florida), in St. Petersburg, Florida
 Sunken Gardens (Huntington, Indiana)
 Sunken Gardens (Nebraska), in Lincoln, Nebraska
 Sunken Garden (Virginia), at The College of William & Mary in Virginia

Other places
 Muntinlupa Sunken Garden, Metro Manila, Philippines
 Cistern of Mocius (Turkish for Sunken garden of Altımermer), Istanbul, Turkey
 Sunken Gardens in Jackson Park, Windsor, Ontario, Canada
 Sunken Garden in Woolton Woods, Liverpool, England

Other uses
 Sunken Garden, a 2013 opera by Michel van der Aa and David Mitchell
 Sunken Garden United F.C., an association football based club in the Philippines